Apios is a genus of flowering plants in the family Fabaceae. It belongs to the subfamily Faboideae. Its member species are found in North America and Asia between latitudes of 50° and 20°. The term "Apios" comes from the Greek word for "pear" and may refer the pear shape of some tubers. Several members of this genus are known to have edible, tuberous roots.

References

Phaseoleae
Fabaceae genera